In enzymology, a 12beta-hydroxysteroid dehydrogenase is an enzyme that catalyzes the chemical reaction

3alpha,7alpha,12beta-trihydroxy-5beta-cholanate + NADP+  3alpha,7alpha-dihydroxy-12-oxo-5beta-cholanate + NADPH + H+

Thus, the two substrates of this enzyme are 3alpha,7alpha,12beta-trihydroxy-5beta-cholanate and NADP+, whereas its 3 products are 3alpha,7alpha-dihydroxy-12-oxo-5beta-cholanate, NADPH, and H+.

This enzyme belongs to the family of oxidoreductases, specifically those acting on the CH-OH group of donor with NAD+ or NADP+ as acceptor. The systematic name of this enzyme class is 12beta-hydroxysteroid:NADP+ 12-oxidoreductase. Other names in common use include 12beta-hydroxy steroid (nicotinamide adenine dinucleotide phosphate), and dehydrogenase.

References

 

EC 1.1.1
NADPH-dependent enzymes
Enzymes of unknown structure